"The Mocking Bird" is a popular song. It was recorded twice by The Four Lads. The song was written by D. Jordan. The B-side was "I May Hate Myself In The Morning".

Song Information
The first version, made April 16, 1952, was released on Columbia's Okeh label in 1952 (reaching number 23 on the Billboard chart that year) and re-released four years later on Columbia (number 67 on the 1956 chart.)  A new recording was made in 1958, entering the Billboard Hot 100 list on November 24, 1958, eventually reaching number 32 on that chart.

References

1952 songs
The Four Lads songs